In enzymology, a carnitinamidase is an enzyme that catalyzes the chemical reaction

L-carnitinamide + H2O  L-carnitine + NH3

Thus, the two substrates of this enzyme are L-carnitinamide and H2O, whereas its two products are L-carnitine and NH3.

This enzyme belongs to the family of hydrolases, those acting on carbon-nitrogen bonds other than peptide bonds, specifically in linear amides.  The systematic name of this enzyme class is L-carnitinamide amidohydrolase. Other names in common use include L-carnitinamidase, carnitine amidase, and L-carnitine amidase.

References

Further reading 

 

EC 3.5.1
Enzymes of unknown structure